Amita Marie Nicolette Berthier (born 15 December 2000) is a Singaporean fencer based in US. She attends the University of Notre Dame. On 16 December 2017, Berthier, a left-handed foil fencer, became the first Singaporean fencer to win a Junior World Cup title at the Havana leg in Cuba in the eight-leg series.

In April 2021, she qualified for the Singapore Olympic team at the 2020 Summer Olympics, becoming the first Singaporean to win a spot through qualifying tournament.

References

External links
 

2000 births
Living people
Singaporean female foil fencers
Fencers at the 2018 Asian Games
Asian Games bronze medalists for Singapore
Asian Games medalists in fencing
Medalists at the 2018 Asian Games
Competitors at the 2019 Southeast Asian Games
Southeast Asian Games medalists in fencing
Southeast Asian Games gold medalists for Singapore
Fencers at the 2020 Summer Olympics
Olympic fencers of Singapore
21st-century Singaporean women